Mahafalytenus is a genus of East African wandering spiders first described by D. Silva-Dávila in 2007.

Species
 it contains seven species, all found in Madagascar:
Mahafalytenus fo Silva-Dávila, 2007 – Madagascar
Mahafalytenus fohy Silva-Dávila, 2007 – Madagascar
Mahafalytenus hafa Silva-Dávila, 2007 – Madagascar
Mahafalytenus isalo Silva-Dávila, 2007 – Madagascar
Mahafalytenus osy Silva-Dávila, 2007 – Madagascar
Mahafalytenus paosy Silva-Dávila, 2007 – Madagascar
Mahafalytenus tsilo Silva-Dávila, 2007 (type) – Madagascar

References

Araneomorphae genera
Ctenidae
Spiders of Madagascar